SMC Recordings is an independent hip hop record label established in 2005 in Del Valle, Texas, by Charles Vasquez, Micheal Luna, and Saroj Thapa. SMC primarily signs and distributes established hip hop artists.

SMC grew out of a vision that Saroj Thapa  had in early 2000s to launch a new kind of record label, one based in his hometown, that would be about hip hop music. Saroj crossed paths with Micheal Luna and Charles Vasquez, and SMC came one step closer to being realized. An ambitious Bay Area-bred music fan and aficionado, Bronson was covering East Texas's colorful hip hop scene for a fledgling urban music magazine called Showcase at the time. Saroj hired him as his partner and in the A&R position. His instincts were right—the first release brought in and shepherded by Bronson was Ya Boy's first cousins, Bay Area hip-hop artists San Quinn and Messy Marv. At one point, Bizzy Bone of Bone Thugs-N-Harmony was signed to SMC.

The recruitment of Tashjian's fellow industry icon George Nauful to steer the company's business affairs and financial sectors completed the foundation.

George Nauful and Will Bronson are no longer owners, officers, or employees of SMC Recordings.

Artists
Kokane
Messy Marv
B-Legit
San Quinn
Mistah F.A.B.
Ron Artest
JT the Bigga Figga
Pastor Troy
J Stalin
Killer Mike
Green City (Scarfaces Group)
Bizzy Bone
Berner
Capone-N-Noreaga
Capone
Noreaga
Capone-N-Noreaga
Rappin' 4-Tay
Big L (posthumously)
Roscoe
Stevie Joe
PSD
The Pack (group)
The Jacka
Husalah
Philthy Rich
Mill The Rapper
Dem Hoodstarz
G-Stack
V-White
Savage
Get Low Playaz
Rakim
Paul Wall
Bullys Wit Fullys
Eddi Projex
Psycho Realm 
Murs
Smigg Dirtee
Koshir

Discography

Albums

2005 

Bizzy Bone - Speaking In Tongues
B-Legit - Block Movement
Ya Boy - Rookie of The Year
Guce - Controversial

2006 

Pastor Troy - Stay Tru
Dido Brown - Tales of A Young Brown Male
Mac Minister - The Minister of Defense
Kokane - Back 2 tha Clap
Lil' Al - Hood Raised
Deep Fried Funk Brothers - Out of The Frying Pan Into The Fire
Bullys Wit Fullys - The Infrastructure
San Quinn - The Rock: Pressure Makes Diamonds
Messy Marv - Draped Up and Chipped Out
Eldorado Red - East Side Rydah
Balance - Young and Restless
Lil' J - Back Like I Left Something
Roscoe - I Luv Cali

2007 
Pastor Troy - Tool Muziq
Turf Talk - West Coast Vaccine: The Cure
PSD, Keak Da Sneak & Messy Marv - Da Bidness
Messy Marv - Muzik 4 Da Taliban
V-White - Perfect Timin
Rappin' 4-Tay - That's What You Thought
Mistah F.A.B. - Da Baydestrian
B-Legit - Throwblock Muzic
Messy Marv - Draped Up & Chipped Out, Vol. 2

2008 

Killer Mike - I Pledge Allegiance to the Grind II
Scarface Presents Green City - Brand New Money
San Quinn - From a Boy to a Man
Messy Marv - Draped Up and Chipped Out, Vol. 3
J. Stalin - Gas Nation
Beeda Weeda - Da Thizzness

2009 
Pastor Troy - Feel Me or Kill Me
Capone-N-Noreaga - Channel 10''
Killer Mike - Underground AtlantaThe Jacka - Tear GasMessy Marv & Berner - BlowLil Atlanta -Itz MePhilthy Rich - Funk Or DieG-Stack - Dr. Purp ThumbHaji Springer - Hurry Up and BuyN.O.R.E. - S.O.R.E.
Capone - Revenge Is A PromiseRakim - The Seventh SealEddie Projex - I Got The Streets On FireBalance & Big Rich - Good As Money 2010 
The Pack - Wolfpack PartyMessy Marv - Thizz CityMurs & 9th Wonder - ForneverJ. Stalin - Prenuptial AgreementSleepy D - Sleepy DeprivationMessy Marv & Berner - Blow: Blocks & Boat DocksStevie Joe - 80's BabyKoshir - White Girl Diaries 2011 

Messy Marv, Keak Da Sneak & PSD - Da Bidness 2Philthy Rich & Messy Marv - Neighborhood Supastar 3U.S.D.A. - The AfterpartyKiller Mike - PL3DGE'''

External links
SMC Recordings official website
SMC Recordings MySpace page
SMC Recordings on FaceBook
Ralph Tashjian quotations

American independent record labels
Hip hop record labels
Gangsta rap record labels